Astwood Halt railway station was a station in Worcester, Worcestershire, England. The station was opened in 1936 and closed in 1940.

References

Disused railway stations in Worcestershire
Railway stations in Great Britain opened in 1936
Railway stations in Great Britain closed in 1940
Former Great Western Railway stations